Many Moods of Moses is the eighth studio album by Beenie Man.

The album was nominated for a Grammy Award and includes the hit singles "Who Am I", "Oysters & Conch" and "Foundation".

Track listing

Personnel
Arp - Performer, Primary Artist, Vocals (Background)
Buju Banton - Arranger, Guest Artist, Performer, Primary Artist, Composer, Producer
Beenie Man - Arranger, Primary Artist, Producer, Vocals, Vocals (Background)
Jason Bloomfield - Engineer
Mark "Stumpy" Brown - Engineer
Leroy Champaign - Artwork, Design, Layout Design
Joel Chin - Mastering
David Cole - Composer
Ansel Collins - Composer
Marlon Cooke - Assistant Engineer, Engineer
Michael Cooper - Engineer
Moses Davis - Arranger, Composer
Sly Dunbar - Arranger, Composer, Guest Artist, Producer
56 Crew - Vocals (Background)
Dean Fraser - Composer, Guest Artist
Jason Frater - Illustrations
Ernie Freeman - Composer
Marie Twiggi Gittens - Vocals (Background)
James Goring - Stylist
Prilly Hamilton - Vocals (Background)
Jeremy Harding - Composer, Engineer, Mixing, Producer
Brendan Harkin - Engineer, Mixing
Hoot Hester - Composer
Michelle Jackson - Vocals (Background)
Brian Jahn - Photography
Anthony Kelly - Arranger, Composer, Engineer, Mixing, Producer
Lady Saw - Guest Artist, Performer, Primary Artist, Vocals (Background)
Raymond Ledgister - Assistant Engineer, Engineer
Little Kirk - Performer, Primary Artist, Vocals (Background)
J.C. Lodge - Guest Artist, Vocals (Background)
Steven "Lenky" Marsden - Composer
Danny Marshall - Composer
Kerry Marx - Composer
Garfield McDonald - Engineer, Mixing
Clyde McKenzie - Art Direction, Design
Ralston McKenzie - Production Assistant
Michael Mendez - Vocals (Background)
Dean Mundy - Assistant Engineer, Composer, Editing, Engineer
Hugh Palmer - Engineer, Mixing
Bob Patin - Arranger, Composer, Producer, Vocals (Background)
Delroy "Fatta" Pottinger - Engineer, Mixing
Patrick Roberts - Compilation Producer, Executive Producer
David Sanguinetti - Project Coordinator
Robbie Shakespeare - Arranger, Composer, Guest Artist, Producer
Paul Shields - Mastering
The Shocking Vibes Crew - Arranger, Group, Producer, Project Coordinator
Milton Sledge - Composer
Steven Stanley - Mixing
Maxine Stowe - Liner Notes
Taxi Gang - Group, Guest Artist, Performer, Primary Artist
Andrew Thomas - Composer, Engineer, Mixing
Handel Tucker - Arranger, Composer, Mixing, Producer
Nicola Tucker - Vocals (Background)
Paul Tyrell  - Production Assistant
Tommy White - Composer
Lloyd "Gitsy" Willis - Arranger, Composer, Producer
Collin "Bulbie" York - Mixing

Chart history

Billboard Top Reggae albums - 1
Billboard 200 - 151
Heatseakers - 5
Top R&B albums - 35

Singles

Who Am I (Sim Simma)
Canadian Singles Chart - 10
Hot Dance Music/Maxi-Singles Sales - 2
Billboard Hot 100 - 40

Reception

AllMusic gave the album 4.5 stars and a positive review saying that: 

City Pages also gave a positive review, saying of the album:

References

1997 albums
Beenie Man albums
VP Records albums